Vyacheslav Vyacheslavovych Churko (born 10 May 1993) is a Ukrainian professional footballer who plays as a right winger who plays for Zorya Luhansk.

Career
Churko was the member of Ukrainian national youth football teams of different ages. From August 2012, he has been playing on loan for Hoverla Uzhhorod. This is based on a loan contract that has been extended for another half-year in December 2012.

Mezőkövesd
On 6 April 2022, Churko joined Mezőkövesd in Hungary on loan until the end of the season.

Personal life
He is of Hungarian descent and holds a Hungarian passport.

Honours
Puskás Akadémia
Nemzeti Bajnokság II: 2016–17

Notes

References

External links 

1993 births
Ukrainian people of Hungarian descent
Sportspeople from Uzhhorod
Living people
Ukrainian footballers
Ukraine youth international footballers
Ukraine under-21 international footballers
FC Shakhtar Donetsk players
FC Shakhtar-3 Donetsk players
FC Hoverla Uzhhorod players
FC Mariupol players
FC Metalist Kharkiv players
Puskás Akadémia FC players
Frosinone Calcio players
FC Kolos Kovalivka players
Mezőkövesdi SE footballers
FC Zorya Luhansk players
Ukrainian Premier League players
Ukrainian Second League players
Nemzeti Bajnokság I players
Serie B players
Association football forwards
Ukrainian expatriate footballers
Expatriate footballers in Hungary
Ukrainian expatriate sportspeople in Hungary
Expatriate footballers in Italy
Ukrainian expatriate sportspeople in Italy